BlueSpice MediaWiki (BlueSpice for short) is free wiki software based on the MediaWiki engine and licensed with the GNU General Public License. It is especially developed for businesses as an enterprise wiki distribution for MediaWiki and used in over 150 countries.

The freely available version BlueSpice free is considered one of the most popular wiki computer programs for knowledge management in companies.

History 
The German company Hallo Welt! has been working on the development of an open source wiki based on MediaWiki since 2007. The origins of the later BlueSpice software go back to an initiative by the IBM CTO Gunter Dueck, who initiated an internal company wiki for IBM Germany in 2007 under the name "bluepedia". The model for the bluepedia project was Wikipedia and accordingly the platform was based on MediaWiki. However, in daily operation, additional requirements arose for the software used. This led to the founding of a company that would develop and provide the missing functions in the future.

In 2011, Hallo Welt! decided to publish their wiki as free and open-source software. The stable version of BlueSpice for MediaWiki was released July 4, 2011. From this point on, a free download has been available at SourceForge. The first release of BlueSpice was a couple of extensions and has developed into a complete stand-alone distribution which has the latest MediaWiki as a core system but offers in the free version more than 50 distinct extensions and a completely different user interface. According to independent sources, the BlueSpice free distribution is one of the most popular wiki software for knowledge management in organisations.

In Autumn 2013, Hallo Welt! released the completely reworked version BlueSpice 2. According to the BlueSpice developers this release aims for opening up BlueSpice for freelance developers in the global MediaWiki community and multiple language versions.

In 2014, BlueSpice for MediaWiki became a project of Translatewiki.net. In January 2015 the developers announced that they will change to a subscription model.

Functionality

Some central features of BlueSpice are:

Visual editing: allowing editing without any knowledge of wiki code (WYSIWYG).
Search and navigation: An extended search (Elasticsearch) offers improved search functionalities, like faceted search. The search results can further be sorted or filtered by category, namespace, author, semantic data, data type etc. Any files attached are also searched. It also provides common features like autocomplete and search as you type. 
Quality assurance and review tools (workflow tool, reminder e.a.): Pages for instance can be assigned to a reviewer. This allows articles to be reviewed and approved.
Book function: Individual articles can be grouped into article collections to create manuals, documentations or instructions with chapter navigation. The books can be exported with it in different formats (PDF, DOCX) together with the respective file attachments.
Meta data and semantic: analyze and work with meta data.
Communication: Additional discussion and blog functionalities, a timeline and notification system support editorial processes.
Administration: Convenient management of users, namespaces, groups, rights and settings.

Technology
BlueSpice is written in the PHP programming language and uses MySQL, Apache/IIS, Tomcat (optional). The editions can be installed on top of an existing MediaWiki installation or as a standalone installation that includes MediaWiki.

The distribution is a collection of extensions, which can be extended with user-specific features or skins. While every single extension can be deactivated, BlueSpice editions integrate and standardize extensions to improve the user experience and maintenance.

Licensing
According to the MediaWiki standard all extensions are published under the GPLv3 license.

Versions

See also

 MediaWiki
 Comparison of wiki software

References

External links
 Official website

Free wiki software
Wiki software
PHP software
Collaborative software
Business software